Jon Sousa (born in 1978 in New Jersey, United States) is a contemporary American musician and solo guitarist from New Jersey, currently residing in Boulder, Colorado. His music contains elements of Celtic, Classical, Jazz, African, Electronic, Bluegrass & Folk, Rock & Heavy Metal. He is also an Irish tenor banjoist, an Irish-rhythm guitar accompanist, as well as an accomplished Sabar drummer. He has studied solo guitar with Pierre Bensusan in Northern France, and Sabar Drumming in Senegal, West Africa, under the guidance of master griot Boubacar Diebate. He has toured extensively in the US and in Northern Europe performing in local pubs and avenues and at house concerts. He is also a band member of folk-rock band Down With Naked from Boulder.

In August 2006 he produced the album entitled 'Jon Sousa'. Currently he is making a duo album with British fiddler Jessie Burns.

References
 Jon Sousa's Website

Music
 Rodney's Glory

1978 births
Living people
Guitarists from New Jersey
21st-century American guitarists